Doomsday X is the tenth studio album by the American death metal band Malevolent Creation. It was released via Nuclear Blast America on July 17, 2007, and was released in Europe on August 24, 2007 via Massacre Records.

Track listing

Personnel
 Bret Hoffmann – vocals
 Phil Fasciana – lead guitars
 Jon Rubin – rhythm guitars
 Jason Blachowicz – bass guitar
 Dave Culross – drums
 Mick Thomson - guitars (track 3 only)

Production
Arranged and produced by Malevolent Creation
Recorded by Gus Rios
Mixed by Gus Rios and Matt LaPlant
Mastered by Alan Douches

References

Malevolent Creation albums
2007 albums